Rodolfo Motta (Buenos Aires, July 11, 1944 – Buenos Aires, August 4, 2014) was an Argentine footballer and coach.

Career
Born in the Mataderos neighborhood of Buenos Aires, Motta began playing football with local side Club Atlético Nueva Chicago, where he would play in the Argentine Primera División during the 1960s. He continued his playing career in the Primera B Nacional with Sportivo Italiano, Deportivo Español, Deportivo Morón, Excursionistas, Quilmes Atlético Club and Estudiantes de Buenos Aires.

After he retired from playing, Motta became a football manager. His first appointment was with Estudiantes de Buenos Aires in 1982. Next, Motta managed his first club, Nueva Chicago. He would later manage clubs in Peru (Sporting Cristal) and Ecuador (C.S. Emelec).

He died on August 4, 2014, at the age of 70.

References

1944 births
2014 deaths
Argentine footballers
Nueva Chicago footballers
Deportivo Español footballers
Quilmes Atlético Club footballers
Estudiantes de Buenos Aires footballers
Argentine football managers
Nueva Chicago managers
Sporting Cristal managers
Estudiantes de Buenos Aires managers
C.S. Emelec managers
Association footballers not categorized by position
Footballers from Buenos Aires
Arsenal de Sarandí managers